The Boxer is a multirole armoured fighting vehicle designed by an international consortium to accomplish a number of operations through the use of installable mission modules. The governments participating in the Boxer programme have changed as the programme has developed. The Boxer vehicle is produced by the ARTEC GmbH (armoured vehicle technology) industrial group, and the programme is being managed by OCCAR (Organisation for Joint Armament Cooperation). ARTEC GmbH is based in Munich; its parent companies are Krauss-Maffei Wegmann GmbH and Rheinmetall Military Vehicles GmbH on the German side, and Rheinmetall Defence Nederland B.V. for the Netherlands. Overall, Rheinmetall has a 64% stake in the joint venture.

A distinctive and unique feature of the vehicle is its composition of a drive platform module and interchangeable mission modules which allow several configurations to meet different operational requirements.

Other names in use or previously used for Boxer are GTK (armoured transport vehicle) Boxer and MRAV (Multi-Role Armoured Vehicle). Confirmed Boxer customers as of April 2022 are Germany, the Netherlands, Lithuania, Australia and the UK. The Boxer has been produced and seen service in A0, A1 and A2 configurations. The UK Boxer will be of the A3 configuration. Australian deliveries are an A2/A3 hybrid.

Production history

The Boxer started in 1993 as a joint venture design project between Germany and France, with the UK joining the project in 1996. In November 1999, a £70 million contract for eight prototype vehicles (four each, Germany and the UK) was awarded. France left the programme in 1999 to pursue its own design, the Véhicule Blindé de Combat d'Infanterie (VBCI). In February 2001, the Netherlands joined the programme and an additional four prototypes were built for the Netherlands. Boxer, then known as GTK/MRAV/PWV, was unveiled on 12 December 2002. The name Boxer was announced when the second prototype appeared. At this time the first production run was to have been 200 for each country.

The UK Ministry of Defence announced its intention to withdraw from the Boxer programme and focus on the Future Rapid Effect System (FRES) in July 2003. In October 2003, the first Dutch prototype was delivered. In October 2006 the Netherlands confirmed the procurement of 200 Boxers to replace the M577 and the support variants of the YPR-765 in the Royal Netherlands Army. Deliveries were scheduled to run from 2013 through to 2018, and within the RNLA the baseline Boxer is called the Pantserwielvoertuig (PWV).

On 13 December 2006 the German parliament approved the procurement of 272 Boxers for the German Army, to replace some of its M113 and Fuchs TPz 1 vehicles. Production of Boxer had been scheduled to commence in 2004, but production was delayed and the first production example was delivered to the German Army in September 2009. Over seven years, prototypes accrued over 90,000 km of reliability trials and over 90,000 km of durability trials. There are three production facilities for Boxer, one in the Netherlands (Rheinmetall) and two in Germany (Krauss-Maffei Wegmann and Rheinmetall).

2010s 
In December 2015 it was announced that Germany had ordered an additional 131 Boxers worth EUR476 million and that Lithuania had selected the Boxer.

In August 2016 a EUR385.6 million production contract was placed by Lithuania for the supply of 88 Boxers, and at this time it was stated that 53 Boxers would be manufactured by KMW and the remaining 35 by Rheinmetall, with deliveries running 2017–2021. In Lithuanian service, the vehicle is designated as Vilkas (Wolf). The precise mix/number of Lithuanian vehicles was initially unclear but according to Janes, Lithuania will receive 91 Boxers in the A2 configuration, 89 as variants of the baseline IFV configuration, plus two driver-training vehicles. The exact breakdown is 55 squad-leader, 18 platoon-leader, 12 company-leader, and 4 command-post vehicles. A single IFV will be used for maintenance training. The first two vehicles (driver training configuration) were delivered in December 2017. The first two Boxer in IFV configuration were delivered in June 2019 and at this time the Lithuanian MoD stated that 15 vehicles would be delivered in 2019 and that all 89 IFV variants would be delivered by the end of 2023.

Most of the original German Army Boxer order was delivered in the A1 configuration. 40 APC and 16 command posts, however, were delivered in the A0 configuration; these were subsequently upgraded to the A1 configuration. In June 2017 it was announced that the Bundeswehr's Boxer A1 fleet would be upgraded to A2 standard. The first A2 Boxer was delivered in June 2015. The differences between A1 and A2 configurations are relatively minor electrical and mechanical engineering changes. The A2 standard resulted from operations in Afghanistan and incorporates changes in the drive and mission modules that include preparation for the integration of a driver vision system, changes to the stowage concept in both modules, changes to the gearbox, integration of a fire suppression system, modification of the RCWS, interface for an IED jammer, satellite communication system and other minor modifications." The latest Boxer variant is the A3. The British are the first customer of the A3 in its entirety.

In July 2017 ARTEC awarded the then Rheinmetall MAN Military Vehicles (RMMV) a €21 million contract to upgrade 38 Bundeswehr Boxer command vehicles to A2 configuration with work scheduled for completion in mid-2020. At this time the Bundeswehr also had 124 Boxer APCs, 72 ambulances and twelve driver training vehicles to upgrade to A2 status.

In February 2018 it was announced that Slovenia had selected the Boxer as the basis for two new mechanised infantry battle groups. In November it was revealed that pricing issues had impacted the Slovenian procurement timeline and that a new proposal from industry was pending. According to the Slovenian MoD's initial release on the subject, funding had been allocated for the procurement of 48 vehicles in 2018-2020 for the first battle group, which was expected to become operational by 2022, followed by the second in 2025. The desired total was reported to be 112 Boxer (96 IFV, 16 mortar) plus a small number of driver training vehicles. It was reported mid-2019 that the planned Boxer procurement had been suspended, the MoD deciding to conduct research and draw up a new comprehensive tactical study relating to the formation of a medium infantry battalion group, this likely to affect the procurement of 8×8 wheeled armoured vehicles. The  ministry will then re-examine options available and make a decision on how to build a medium infantry battalion group capability.

In July 2016 it had been announced that the Boxer was one of two vehicle types (from four) down-selected to take part in the 12-month Risk Mitigation Activity for Australia's Land 400 Phase 2 project, and in March 2018 it was announced that Rheinmetall Defense Australia (RDA) had been selected as the preferred tenderer for that project which at the time called for 211 vehicles, with a roll out of initial vehicles by 2021 and deliveries scheduled to be complete by 2026. In Australian service the Boxer will replace the army's ageing fleet of 257 Australian Light Armoured Vehicles (ASLAV) that reach their life-of-type around 2021. Under Rheinmetall's offering, the first batch of 20 to 25 vehicles will be built in Germany with Australians embedded into teams to learn the necessary skills before transferring back to Australia for the build of the remaining vehicles. RDA's Military Vehicle Centre of Excellence (MILVEHCOE) in Brisbane, Queensland, will be the hub for the production of the majority of the vehicles, the local build programme including about 40 local suppliers. These industrial opportunities will create up to 1,450 jobs across Australia,  The acquisition and sustainment of the vehicles is costed at AUD15.7 billion (US$12.2 billion), acquisition  worth AUD5.2 billion, the remaining AUD10.5 billion costed for sustainment over the vehicles' 30-year life.

In March 2018 it was announced by the UK government that it was re-joining the Boxer programme, and in April 2018 it was announced that Boxer had been selected by the British Army to meet its Mechanised Infantry Vehicle (MIV) requirement. No details relating to quantity, cost, timeline or any contractual status was given. It was first reported in October 2016 that the British Ministry of Defence had taken its first formal step towards government-to-government acquisition of Boxer. At DSEI 2017, a Boxer in a Union Jack paint scheme was shown by Rheinmetall to promote the vehicle for the MIV requirement. In November 2017, a company of German army mechanised infantry equipped with 11 Boxers exercised with British Army units on Salisbury Plain. British Army sources denied that the exercise was linked to any decision on a procurement process for its MIV project. In February 2018 it was reported that Artec had signed agreements with UK suppliers, this contributing to the fact that 60% by value of the MIV contract will be done in Britain, along with final assembly of the MIVs at facilities already owned by the consortium.

In July 2018 there were three Boxer-related announcements made over a period of three days. On 17 July the Dutch MoD announced that the last Dutch Boxer had rolled off the production line, this being a cargo variant. On 18 July the Lithuanian MoD announced that the country's first two Boxer prototypes had entered trials in Germany.  On 19 July 2018 the UK MoD disclosed its intent to order between 400 and 600 Boxers in four variants plus driver training vehicles, reference vehicles and support, with the first vehicles to be in-service by 2023. The contract will contain options to increase the quantity of vehicles by up to an additional 900.

In March 2019 the Australian Ambassador to Germany inspected the first Boxer being delivered to the Australian Government under the Land 400 Phase 2 programme prior to its shipping to Australia., and in July 2019 the first two of the 25 Boxer being built in Germany arrived in Australia. The 25 vehicles delivered from Germany are split 13 reconnaissance platforms and 12 multi-purpose vehicles (MPVs). Once in Australia, these vehicles will receive a number of Australia specific modifications prior to final delivery to the Army. The first vehicles were in use for training purposes by October 2020. Rheinmetall will deliver 211 Boxer to the Australian Army under and in service Boxer will fill seven different roles on the battlefield: reconnaissance, command and control, joint fires, surveillance, multi-purpose, battlefield repair and recovery. The reconnaissance variant will account for 133 of the 211 vehicles and is equipped with Rheinmetall's Lance turret system and armed with a 30 mm automatic cannon.

Also in July 2019 the first two Boxer (Vilkas) IFVs ordered by Lithuania were officially handed over to the MoD. The MoD stated that 15 Vilkas would be delivered in 2019 and all 89 vehicles would be delivered by the end of 2023.

In September 2019 there were three Boxer-related announcements. On 10 September it was revealed that the target date for the UK's MIV programme to receive its main gate approval was 22 October 2019. It was reported that the business case for the purchase of an initial batch of 508 vehicles, valued at about GBP1.2 billion (US$1.48 billion), was currently under scrutiny by financial, commercial, and technical experts before receiving final approval by ministers. UK MoD officials submitted their final business case for the purchase of the Boxer MIVs on 9 September 2019 to meet the British Army's target of getting its first Boxer in service by 2023. At the 2019 Defence and Security Equipment International exhibition (DSEI 2019) in London, Germany's Flensburger Fahrzeugbau Gesellschaft (FFG) presented an armoured recovery mission module (ARM) for the Boxer  Christoph Jehn, FFG's project manager, stated the ARM was developed as a private venture from 2017. The company noticed Boxer users struggling to recover stranded vehicles with the aid of other Boxers and so decided to develop the bespoke mission module for the purpose. The ARM has an approximate weight of 13 tonnes, is manned by two personnel and connects to the Boxer using standard mechanical interfaces. On 24 September 2019 it was announced that the first Boxer for the Australian Army had formally been handed over. The turretless vehicle was the first of 25 Boxers – 13 multipurpose and 12 reconnaissance variants – that are being manufactured in Germany through to 2021 to meet an early Australian capability requirement for familiarisation and training purposes. Production of the other 186 platforms will begin in late 2020/early 2021 at a military vehicle centre of excellence constructed by Rheinmetall at Ipswich, southwest of Brisbane, and that formally opened in October 2020. This is the company's largest facility outside Germany. Also in September 2019 reports emerged that Algeria had selected the Boxer and that production would commence shortly. As of Q1 2022 this had not been confirmed by ARTEC.

In November 2019 the UK Ministry of Defence awarded ARTEC a US$2.97 billion (GBP2.3 billion) contract to deliver more than 520 Boxer vehicles in multiple configurations.

2020s 
In January 2020 in an interview with Shaun Connors of Jane's, Stefan Lischka, MD of ARTEC, stated that only 8% of UK Boxers would be manufactured in Germany with the remainder being assembled at and delivered from two sites in the UK, Rheinmetall BAE Systems Land (RBSL) at Telford and KMW subsidiary WFEL at Stockport. Deliveries of series examples should start very early in 2023.

In November 2020 it was announced that ARTEC consortium partners Rheinmetall Landsysteme and Krauss-Maffei Wegmann (KMW) had awarded two separate subcontracts to Rheinmetall BAE Systems Land (RBSL) and WFEL respectively for the local production of Boxer for the UK. RBSL and WFEL were selected by Rheinmetall and KMW respectively to be the UK Tier 1 suppliers and will operate one Boxer production line each. The value of KMW's contract has not been announced but is known to involve at least 480 drive modules being produced by WFEL in the UK, with under half of them being assembled by WFEL into full vehicles covering the Infantry Carriers, Specialist Carriers and Ambulance variants. The remaining drive modules being produced by WFEL will be shipped to RBSL to construct the other full vehicles in a number of variants, including the Specialist Carrier. Rheinmetall's contract with RBSL is worth US$1.15 billion (GPB860 million) and involves the manufacture of 262 Boxer vehicles at RBSL's assembly line in Telford, UK. All of these vehicles will either be the Specialist Carrier or Command vehicles.

The German Federal Office of Bundeswehr Equipment, Information Technology and In-Service Support (BAAINBw) awarded Rheinmetall a contract at the end of January 2021 to upgrade 27 more Boxer command vehicles to the A2 standard, this award bringing all the Bundeswehr's Boxer command vehicles up A2 standard.

In December 2019 Germany's BAAINBw ordered 10 Boxer C-UAV (Counter UAV) systems. By June 2020 all elements of the system had passed the critical design review and a live firing had been conducted. It was aimed to deliver the first systems to the Bundeswehr by the close of 2020. Boxers with the C-UASs will be used to protect the NATO Response Force Very High Readiness Joint Task Force (VJTF) when Germany retakes leadership of the service in 2023.

The Bundeswehr announced in June 2020 that it would replace the Wiesel weapon carrier with a  mission module bringing the combination of a 30 mm cannon and Spike-LR anti-tank guided missile from the Puma infantry fighting vehicle to the wheeled platform. The heavy weapon carrier will be the fifth version of the Boxer in service with the German Army and current planning calls for training to begin on the new heavy weapon carrier in 2025, with the first three infantry battalions to be equipped with the system by 2027. No contract is currently in place.

In September 2021 OCCAR announced a new reconnaissance vehicle mission module for the Bundeswehr known as the Joint Fire Support Team  (heavy) differentiating it from the smaller Fennek scout car. The new variant will be centered around a sensor mast known as the Panoramic Above Armour Gimbal (PAAG) and built by Thales, with imaging sensors for visible to thermal infrared spectra and rangefinding and targeting lasers. Prototype delivery is expected in 2023 and full proection in 2025.

On 8 April 2022 it was disclosed that British Army would receive an additional 100 Boxer, bringing the order total to 623. No variant breakdown or other details was provided.

By late 2023, ARTEC will have five Boxer assembly lines in operation which will have the capacity to produce 200 vehicles per year beginning in 2024.

Design 
The Boxer is an eight-wheeled multirole vehicle that at the time of its development easily exceeded most comparable vehicles in weights and dimensions. In recent years the size/weight differences between Boxer and its contemporaries has reduced considerably, with Boxer quoted to have a combat weight of 36.5 tonnes in 2016 in A1 and A2 configurations, while vehicles such as ST Kinetics' Terrex 3 had a quoted combat weight of 35 tonnes, and Nexter's VBCI, Patria's AMV and General Dynamics' Piranha V all weighing in around the 32 to 33 tonne mark. Current combat weight of the Boxer in A3 configuration is quoted as up to 38.5 tonnes. However, Artec conducted trials in December 2021 with a Boxer weighing 41 tonnes. The vehicle, which was ballasted and without a mission module, traversed gaps up to 2.2 m, climbed a 60° slope, and surmounted a 1 m vertical step during trials. Artec managing director Stefan Lischka stated that there was no actual customer requirement for such a heavy Boxer at this time. The heaviest current version is the remote-controlled howitzer (RCH) version at 39 tonnes.

Boxer consists of two key elements: the platform/drive-line (the drive module) and the removable mission module.

Drive module

The drive module contains the wheels and the engine. It is also known as the platform or the drive-line module. The A iterations applied to Boxer are specific to the drive module. Initial production examples were A0 and fewer than 60 were delivered. Main production was A1, followed in 2015 by A2. Current production standard depending on user is either A2 or A3. Australia is receiving an A2/A3 hybrid, in that it will receive the latest A3 drive module (rated at 38,500 kg) but with the A2 standard engine rating of 

The platform/drive module has the driver located front right, with the power pack to the left. The MTU/Allison powerpack can be replaced under field conditions in about 30 minutes and can, if required, be run outside of the vehicle for test purposes. Boxer is full-time all-wheel drive, the front four wheels steering. Suspension is double-wishbone coil springs, independent all round. Tyres are either 415/80 R27 or 415/80 R685, and a central tire inflation system and run-flat inserts are fitted.

Mission module

The mission module contains the mission-specific elements, such as weapons, equipment or crew. It is a key (and unique) feature of Boxer. Mission modules are interchangeable pod-like units that are fitted to drive modules to form a complete mission variant vehicle. Mission modules are attached by four points and can be swapped within an hour under field conditions. The driver can access their compartment through the mission module or in an emergency via the large single-piece power-operated hatch above this position.

Armament 

Production Boxers are fitted with a variety of armament ranging from a 7.62 mm light machine gun in a remote weapon station to a 30 mm cannon in a turret. Numerous armament options are offered.

Most in-service Boxers are equipped with a remote weapon station for self-defense. Dutch vehicles are fitted with the Protector M151 RWS from Kongsberg fitted with a 12.7 mm heavy machine gun. German vehicles are usually fitted with the FLW-200 from KMW, which can be fitted with either a 7.62 mm MG3 machine gun, a 12.7 mm M3M HMG or a 40 mm GMW automatic grenade launcher. The FLW-200 has dual-axis stabilization and incorporates a laser rangefinder and a thermal imager.

Lithuanian Boxers are fitted with the Israeli-made RAFAEL Advanced Defense Systems Samson Mk II RCT turret, mounting a fully stabilised Orbital ATK Mk 44 30 mm dual-feed cannon, 7.62 mm co-axial MG, and  Spike-LR  missiles. The turret is fitted with an independent commander's sight with both commander and gunner provided with thermal and daylight channels.

Australian Boxer CRVs mount the Rheinmetall Lance 30 mm two-man turret, fitted with the Rheinmetall Mauser MK30-2/ABM (air-bursting munition) dual-feed stabilised cannon and 7.62 mm coaxial MG. Turret traverse is all electric through a full 360° with weapon elevation from -15° to +45°. A Rheinmetall computerised fire-control system is installed, which allows stationary and moving targets to be engaged. The gunner has a Rheinmetall Stabilised Electro-Optical Sighting System (SEOSS), which typically has day/thermal channels and an eye-safe laser rangefinder. The commander has a Rheinmetall SEOSS panoramic sighting system, which allows hunter/killer target engagements to take place.

Protection 
The Boxer is constructed from rolled all-welded steel armour to which the AMAP-B module-based appliqué armour kit can be fitted as required by mission threat estimates. AMAP-B modules are taken from the IBD Diesenroth AMAP modular armour package and are fitted to the vehicle with shock absorbing mountings.
Exact details of Boxer protection levels have now been classified. According to ARTEC, the vehicle will withstand anti-personnel and large anti-tank mines of an undisclosed type under the wheel, platform or side attack. It has previously been stated that Boxer's baseline armour is all-round resistant to 14.5 mm armour-piercing ammunition in accordance with STANAG 4569 Level 4.

To increase survivability in case of armour penetration, the crew compartment is completely covered by an AMAP-L spall liner. The spall liner stops most of the fragments of the armour and projectile brought about by hull penetration. To further enhance crew protection, the seats are decoupled from the floor, this preventing the shock of a mine-detonation being directly transmitted to the crew. The roof armour of the Boxer is designed to withstand artillery fragments and top attack weapons such as bomblets fitted with a High-Explosive Anti-Tank (HEAT) warhead.

The Boxer drive module A1 (as designated by the German BWB) is an upgraded version of the baseline A0 version of the Boxer drive module, with the primary difference being the installation of a mine protection package fitted to the belly and wheel stations of the vehicle. The vehicle is fitted an additional armour package focused on protecting against side and underbody blast threats. This consists of the AMAP-M and AMAP-IED packages. An unspecified electronic countermeasure (ECM) system was also fitted to counter IEDs. These changes result in a 1,058 kg weight increase for the A1 over the baseline A0 APC variant. For the A2 Boxer protection is reported to have been increased further.

Mobility and transport

The powerpack of Boxer consists of a MTU 8V199 TE20 diesel engine developing (originally) 720 hp and coupled to an Allison HD4070 fully automatic transmission with seven forward and three reverse gears. The powerpack can be replaced under field conditions in approximately 20 minutes. The MTU 8V199 TE20 engine is a militarised development of the Mercedes-Benz OM 500 truck engine, modified by MTU to produce increased power via changes to the turbocharger, fuel injection and cooling systems. Boxer is fitted with three fuel tanks containing a total of 562 litres, divided between a 280-litre front tank, 238-litre rear tank, and a 44-litre reserve tank.

Boxer has full-time 8×8 drive with differential locks on all axles and the front four wheels steer. Tyres are 415/80R 27 Michelin XML on German and Dutch Boxers. The Land 400 prototypes were fitted with 415/80R 685 Michelin XForce 2 tyres, these having a 500 kg per wheel greater load rating than the XML and being more 'all-terrain' in design than the rocks/mud-optimised XML. Standard tyre fit for Australian and UK Boxers will be 415/80R 685 Michelin XForce ZL rated to carry 5,600 kg each.  
 
A central tire inflation system (CTIS) is fitted, and run-flat inserts allow for 30 km travel at up to 50 km/h in the event of a puncture. Braking is provided by Knott pneumatic ABS on all wheels with main braking power actuated on the front two axles. Suspension is fully independent double wishbone with coil springs.

Boxer can be transported in the Airbus A400M tactical airlifter, albeit not in one piece. With a capacity of around 32-tonnes, the loading ramp of an A400M cannot accommodate a Boxer so the drive and mission modules need to be separated for transport. Two Boxers can be transported by three A400Ms, two for the drive modules and a third for the mission modules.

Boxer variants and mission modules overview
As of April 2022 Artec outlined 23 mission modules for Boxer, and suggested that two more would soon be introduced. Of the 23, 10 were stated to be delivered or being delivered, five contracted, and the remaining eight at prototype/concept stage. Of note, Artec can in some instances define the same mission module function as separate Mission Module types, an example being Dutch and German Ambulance modules which account for two of the 23 outlined modules.

 Armoured Personnel Carrier – The armoured personnel carrier (APC) variant can be considered a baseline configuration for Boxer. The German Army received 125 APC modules as part of the initial 272-vehicle order. All 131 vehicles from the second German Army order are in a new configuration of the armoured personnel carrier (Gepanzertes Transportfahrzeug) and in A2 configuration.
 Command Post – The command post variants of Boxer are used for command and control in theatre, acting as a centre for tactical communications. Secured communication, displays for situational awareness and instruments for network-enabled warfare are key characteristics of this variant. In standard configuration the command post module offers room for four workstations and the vehicle crew consists of driver, commander/weapon operator, two staff officers, one staff assistant and one additional crew member. The German Army received 65 command post modules as part of the initial 272-vehicle order; the Dutch Army ordered 60 command post modules originally, but later reduced this to 36 modules. Australia and the UK will also receive command post variants of Boxer. Lithuania's command post variants will be based around the IFV. The UK has a requirement for a command and control mission module this designated Mechanised Infantry Vehicle Command and Control (MIV-CC), and Australia has a requirement for a command and control mission module, plus a specialist surveillance mission module.
 Ambulance – The German Army received 72 ambulance modules as part of the initial 272-vehicle order; the Dutch Army ordered 52 ambulance modules. The German and Dutch Boxer ambulance variant utilise a mission module with a raised roofline providing an internal height of 1.85 m and volume of 17.5 m3. In Dutch service the Boxer ambulance replaced the YPR-765 prgwt variant of the AIFV (Armored Infantry Fighting Vehicle) casualty transport and it can accommodate seven casualties that are seated or three lying down on stretchers, or one of the following combinations: three seated and two lying down, or four seated and a single casualty lying down. The crew consists of driver, commander and a single medic. The Dutch vehicle, a medical evacuation vehicle, differs from the German medical treatment vehicle. Australia and the UK have ordered ambulance modules, the UK variant to be known as Mechanised Infantry Vehicle Ambulance (MIV-A).
 Combat Reconnaissance Vehicle – The combat reconnaissance (CRV) is a development of the baseline Boxer designed to fulfil the Australian Land 400 Phase 2 requirement. It mounts the Rheinmetall Defence Lance modular turret system (MTS) fitted with the MK30-2/ABM cannon. Other variants being developed for Australia are an Ambulance, a Command & Control, a Joint Fires, a Surveillance, and Repair & Recovery variants.
 Vilkas (Wolf) – 89 of 91 Lithuanian Vilkas/Wolf will be fitted with the Rafael Advanced Defense Systems Samson Mk II RCT turret mounting a fully stabilised Orbital ATK Mk 44 30 mm dual-feed cannon, 7.62 mm co-axial MG, and Spike-LR missiles. A range of turret options were bid including the unmanned Lance turret from the PSM Puma IFV, however the selected vehicle mounts the Rafael Advanced Defense Systems Samson Mk II RCT armed with a 30 mm cannon, 7.62 mm co-axial MG, and Spike-LR missiles. Lithuania will receive four variants of the IFV, 55 IFV squad leader, 18 IFV platoon leader; 12 IFV company leader; 4 IFV command post. Variants vary by mission fit primarily in the areas of additional voice and data communication equipment as well as modified BMS. Two driver training vehicles are also included in the Lithuanian order.
 Geniegroep  – The Boxer Geniegroep (GNPR) is a Dutch-specific engineering and logistics support vehicle that is deployed for the transport of troops and engineer group equipment. It provides seating for six dismounts with space available for their personal equipment and an additional separate stowage section for munitions. It may be deployed as a support vehicle with other units or used for independent assignments such as route clearance, or as a protected work location during mine clearance or demolition operations. The Boxer GNGP replaces the YPR-765 prgm/PRCO-C3 variant of the AIFV (Armored Infantry Fighting Vehicle). The Royal Netherlands Army initially ordered 53 GNPR, this later revised to 92, and has subsequently converted 12 of the 92 GNGP vehicles ordered to Boxer Battle Damage Repair (BDR) configuration. The BDR variant is able to accommodate the special equipment, tools, expendable and non-expendable supplies needed to carry out diagnoses, maintenance and minor repairs if required. Crew consists of an engineer commander, driver, observing commander, gunner, and five engineers.
 Cargo – The Boxer Cargo is a Dutch-specific variant that replaces the YPR-765 prv variant of the AIFV (Armored Infantry Fighting Vehicle). It is equipped with a special loading floor to secure cargo during transport and can transport a maximum of two standard one tonne army pallets (max. load 2,5 t). The interior design of the vehicle allows adaptation as necessary for different kinds of missions. For conducting peace-keeping missions or other peacetime operations the set of vehicle equipment can be changed and tailored to suit as required. Crew consists of commander/gunner and driver. 27 cargo examples were originally ordered, this later revised to 12. A cargo variant was the final Dutch Boxer produced.
 Driver Training Vehicle – This driver training vehicle (DTV) variant is equipped with a training module. The driver sits in the conventional driver's station and the instructor is seated in an elevated position in the driver training cabin.  Active occupant protection is designed to protect the crew sitting exposed in the driver training cabin. In the event of a roll-over accident, the instructor and upper occupant seats are electronically retracted into the Driver Training Module. In normal use, the instructor can monitor the trainee driver via a duplicated control and display unit and override gear selector, brake and accelerator pedal of the driver's station. Steering override is available as an option. Crew consists of a trainee driver, instructor, plus up to two additional trainee passengers. The Australian, Dutch (8), German (10) and Lithuanian (2) armies operate driver training vehicles.
 Repair and Recovery – Australia and the UK will receive a repair and recovery mission module, the details of which have yet to be released. The UK designation for this variant is  Mechanised Infantry Vehicle Repair and Recovery (MIV-REC).

Other identified modules:

United Kingdom: The UK will procure Boxer in three/four (source dependent) main variants. These are the baseline protected mobility (PM) variant (MIV-PM), a command and control (MIV-CC), an ambulance (MIV-A), and a repair/recovery (MIV-REP) variant. In terms of numbers, 285 personnel-carrying variants are on order, divided into 85 infantry carriers, 60 engineer section vehicles, 62 recce/fire support vehicles, and 28 mortar carriers. Another 50 of the APC variants are to be configured as repair vehicles (MIV-REP) and these are dependent on source presented as the fourth variant. A total of 177 Boxer are ordered in the C4I configurations, again divided into 123 command-and-control (C2) and C2 utility vehicles, 19 observation post vehicles, 24 beyond-line-of-sight observation platforms, and 11 EW and SIGINT platforms. The remaining 61 are to be ambulances.
 
Australia: Of the seven Boxer variants required by Australia there is also a joint fires mission module and a surveillance mission module.

Germany: Germany's BAAINBw ordered 10 Boxer C-UAV (Counter UAV) systems in December 2019, placing contracts with Kongsberg and Hensoldt in a EUR24 million contract, with delivery to be completed within 24 months. By June 2020 all elements of the system had passed the critical design review and a live firing had been conducted. It was aimed to deliver the first systems to the Bundeswehr by the close of 2020. The initial operational capability requires only a single sensor, which provides a 120° coverage in azimuth. Boxers with the C-UASs will be used to protect the NATO Response Force Very High Readiness Joint Task Force (VJTF) when Germany retakes leadership of the service in 2023.

The Bundeswehr's Wiesel weapon carrier will be replaced by the Boxer heavy weapon carrier and this will be armed with the same 30 mm cannon as the Puma infantry fighting vehicle and Mehrrollenfähiges leichtes Lenkflugkörper-System (Multirole-capable Light Missile System, MELLS), the Bundeswehr's designation for Spike LR. The turret will also be equipped with a 360° vision system and warning and observation systems. The heavy weapon carrier will be the fifth version of the Boxer in service with the German Army and current planning calls for training to begin on the new heavy weapon carrier in 2025, with the first three infantry battalions to be equipped with the system by 2027. No contract is currently in place.

As part of the Joint Fire Support Team (JFST) contract four prototype Boxer configured with Panoramic Above Armour Gimbals (PAAGs) will be manufactured in 2023, with a follow-on production contract anticipated in 2025. Integration of the PAAG will create a new German Army Boxer variant termed the Joint Fire Support Team schwer (JFSTsw).

During an interview with Jane's at IAV 2020, Stefan Lishka, MD of ARTEC commented that the term "configuration" had superseded variant for Boxers, and Boxer modules. The reason for this was that some current/planned variants (build configurations) are interchangeable by crew members.

Other variants including prototypes, concepts and developmental platforms
 Boxer JODAA - Boxer JODAA (Joint Operational Demonstrator for Advanced Applications) is a technology demonstrator used by the German Army and Rheinmetall Landsysteme to carry out R&D studies around potential Boxer improvements. It is based on the Boxer armoured medical treatment vehicle variant and is regularly refitted for a range of purposes and roles. 
 Boxer Skyranger 35 - Boxer has been shown fitted with the Oerlikon Skyranger 35 air defence system turret. This is armed with Rheinmetall's 35mm x 228 calibre Revolver Gun, this having the option of a dual ammunition feeding system that allows the choice of two types of shell. It would primarily fire the 35 mm Advanced Hit Efficiency And Destruction (AHEAD) ammunition, which although optimised for the air defence role is also effective against ground targets including lightly protected vehicles. The secondary nature would be Frangible Armour-Piercing Discarding Sabot (FAPDS) ammunition.  The gun has a cyclic rate of fire of 1,000 rounds a minute, with a typical aerial target being engaged by a burst of 20 to 24 rounds.
 Boxer Skyranger 30 - Boxer has been shown fitted with the Oerlikon Skyranger 30 air defence system turret at the Eurosatory 2022 exhibition. The Skyranger 30 turret has an autocannon firing time fuzed 30x173 mm ammunition and two short range missiles like Stinger or Mistral. It has five AESA radar arrays for 360 degrees coverage and a day and night elecrooptical sight for target engagement.   
 Boxer IFV Demonstrator/RCT30 - Boxer IFV Demonstrator is a technology demonstrator used by Rheinmetall Landsysteme to demonstrate, market, and test the company's preferred configuration for an IFV variant of the Boxer platform. Boxer RCT30 IFV is a technology demonstrator used by KMW for the same purposes. The vehicle mounts the unmanned Rheinmetall RCT, the latest development of the turret fitted to the German Army's PSM Puma IFV. The turret is installed on the forward part of the rear Boxer mission module and armed with the stabilised Orbital ATK Armament Systems 30 mm MK44 dual-feed cannon with option of a coaxial 7.62 mm MG. On top of this is the KMW FL 200 RCWS armed with a 12.7 mm MG that can be replaced by a 5.56 mm or 7.62 mm MG or a 40 mm AGL. It was stated that an alternate primary armament, the Mauser MK30-2 ABM dual-feed 30 mm cannon could be installed if requested.
 Boxer Armoured Recovery Module (ARM) - The Boxer ARM is a repair and recovery mission module developed by FFG to provide Boxer users with a recovery and maintenance capability as well as an operational means to mount mission modules onto drive modules.
 Boxer RCH155 - Boxer RCH155 mounts a version of the KMW Artillery Gun Module (AGM). This is a further development of the Panzerhaubitze 2000 155 mm 52-calibre artillery system. The system was developed to meet potential requirements of export customers a wheeled Boxer-type platform has greater strategic mobility than tracked and heavier PzH 2000-type system. Initial firing trials have taken place. In December 2020 Krauss-Maffei Wegmann (KMW) announced in a press release that it plans to begin developmental testing of the Remote Controlled Howitzer (RCH) 155 mm gun in 2021, this essentially a remotely controllable version of the RCH155.
 Boxer, direct fire support - In April 2020 John Cockerill Defense revealed that it was supplying a C3105 two-person turret armed with 105 mm rifled gun to KMW so that it could be incorporated onto Boxer. The company stated that the development was funded by internal R&D budgets and that firing trials were anticipated to take place within the course of 2020. Firing trials are now planned to take place in Germany or the UK when COVID-19 restrictions are lifted. The vehicle was to be shown for the first time at the Eurosatory exhibition in Paris in June 2020, but that event was cancelled due to the pandemic.
 Boxer WFEL bridging module concept - The Boxer WFEL bridging module concept is a variant designed by WFEL and KMW as a private venture, to meet the need to integrate the Leguan bridging system onto medium-sized vehicles. The module which can deploy either a heavy 14 m or a lighter 22 m bridge was shown in September 2021. The 14 m bridge can handle military load class (MLC) 80 or 100, and the 22 m bridge MLC 50. The 14 and 22 m options are considered separate Mission Modules according to Artec's 23 outlined examples.
 Boxer ARTHUR - At the 2020 Omega Future Indirect Fires/Mortar Systems conference in the UK Saab displayed a concept of its ARTHUR Mod D mounted onto the mission module of a Boxer. Saab said ARTHUR Mod D was its “answer to the requirements for a highly mobile, agile, and long range WLR, supporting high tempo brigade and divisional manoeuvre operations. The technology is drawing on [both] existing and evolutions of Saab in-house sensor technologies”, and can be seen “as a spiral development” of ARTHUR.
 Boxer Mobile LWS - The Boxer Mobile LWS (laser weapon system) demonstrator was a version of the Boxer armoured medical treatment vehicle that was fitted with a RWS coupled to a Rheinmetall RMG 12.7 mm HMG, integrated with an unmanned protected turret and fitted with a fully-automated MANTIS turret. No further development or production has taken place.
 Boxer Overwatch - A demonstrator of the Boxer equipped with a mission module for launching Brimstone missiles was unveiled at the Defence Vehicle Dynamics (DVD) event held at the Millbrook Proving Ground on 21 and 22 September 2022. Known as Boxer Overwatch, this variant was developed by RBSL in collaboration with MBDA to show how the companies may be able to meet British Army requirements for a Mounted Close Combat Overwatch (MCCO) system. This is intended to be capable of engaging armoured targets at greater stand-off ranges than the retired Swingfire anti-tank guided missile (ATGM) mounted on the FV102 Striker tracked armoured vehicle. It forms part of the wider Battle Group Organic Anti-Armour (BGOAA) initiative to refresh the British Army's anti-armour capabilities. In its concept form the Boxer Overwatch mission module carries a single eight-cell launcher for the 50 kg Brimstone missile facing towards the left side of the vehicle. The launcher is lowered to a horizontal position for travelling and raised before a fire mission. RBSL suggested that if the system receives a production contract it could be brought into service concurrently with other British Army Boxer variants since it would not require an extensive development cycle.
 Boxer (tracked) - Krauss-Maffei Wegmann (KMW) presented a tracked version of the Boxer armoured vehicle at the Eurosatory defence exhibition being held in Paris from 13 to 17 June, 2022. The version on display at Eurosatory was armed with a KMW RCT120 remote-controlled turret armed with a 120 mm smoothbore gun with an automatic loader. Compared to the wheeled Boxer, the maximum weight of the tracked Boxer increases to 45 tonnes.

Gallery

Operators

Current operators
 : Australian Army – 211 vehicles on order, with deliveries expected until 2026. Vehicles to be delivered under the Land 400 Phase 2 programme. The first of 25 Boxers – 13 multipurpose and 12 turreted reconnaissance variants that are being manufactured in Germany through to 2021 to meet an early Australian capability requirement for familiarisation and training – were formally handed over to the army in September 2019. Prior to delivery the Boxers were modified locally with Australian-specific communications and battlefield management systems and fitted temporarily with the Kongsberg Protector RWS that previously equipped Australian ASLAVs deployed to Iraq and Afghanistan. Training with the first-delivered vehicles commenced by October 2020. Production of the balance of 186 platforms – a mix of reconnaissance, command-and-control, joint fires, surveillance, ambulance, and battlefield repair and recovery variants – was scheduled to begin in late 2022 at RDA's Military Vehicle Centre of Excellence (MILVEHCOE) at Ipswich in Queensland, Rheinmetall's biggest facility outside Germany. To reduce integration risk, fitting the Australian-designed and produced Electro-Optic Systems R400 Mk 2 RWS to the 133 turreted reconnaissance variants is expected only after domestically produced 30 mm Lance turrets become available from the MILVEHCOE facility, probably sometime in 2023. During Boxer's selection process, protection received a higher priority than lethality. Lethality was followed by mobility, then by sustainability and C4ISR considerations. Australia's Boxer CRV is scheduled to be filled with the Israeli Spike-LR2 anti-tank missile.
 : German Army – 403 vehicles, deliveries until 2020. The first German order consisted of 272 drive modules and 272 accompanying mission modules encompassing 125 APCs, 72 armoured medical treatment vehicles, 10 driver training vehicles, and 65 command vehicles.
 : Lithuanian Land Force – 91 vehicles, deliveries until 2023, with additional purchase of 120 announced in April 2022. Lithuania will receive Boxers in the A2 configuration, 89 as variants of the baseline IFV configuration, plus two driver training vehicles. The IFV breakdown is: 55 IFV squad leader, 18 IFV platoon leader; 12 IFV company leader; 4 IFV command post. A single IFV will be used for maintenance training. The first two vehicles (driver training configuration) were delivered to Lithuania in December 2017. The first two Boxers in IFV configuration were delivered on 25 June 2019, at which time the Lithuanian MoD stated that delivery of 15 vehicles was expected in 2019, and that all 89 IFV variants would be delivered by the end of 2022. In Lithuanian service these vehicles will be known as IFV Vilkas (Vilkas being Lithuanian for wolf). In April 2022 it was reported that Lithuania would purchase more than 120 additional Boxers.
 : Royal Netherlands Army – 200 vehicles, deliveries from 2013 until 2018. The last Dutch Boxer was produced in July 2018. Variant breakdown following a 2016 contract modification was 12 cargo, 92 engineer (12 of the 92 subsequently converted to Battle Damage Repair (BDR) configuration), 36 command post, 8 driver training, 52 ambulance.

Future operators
: Algerian Army – production under license was reportedly to start in 2020, with 500 units to be produced by 2023.
 : in September 2022 it was announced that Ukraine will purchase 18 Boxer RCH155s for €216m, funded from German aid.
 : British Army - 623 vehicles from 2023. Following an announcement on 31 March 2018 by the UK government that it was re-joining the Boxer programme, the UK government announced on 3 April that Boxer had been selected by the British Army to meet its Mechanised Infantry Vehicle (MIV) requirement. On 19 July the UK MoD disclosed its intent to order between 400 and 600 Boxer with options for a further 900, leading to a potential maximum procurement of 1500 vehicles. The first vehicles are currently due to enter service in 2023. As a result of the UK's intended larger order and its return to being a program partner, an option to build and export Boxer from the UK will be explored. In January 2019 Rheinmetall announced that subject to government approvals the company would buy a 55% share of UK-based BAE Systems' land business for £28.6 m. The joint venture (JV) is called Rheinmetall BAE Systems Land (RBSL) and is headquartered at BAE's existing facility in Telford, Shropshire. On 5 November 2019, it was announced that a £2.3 billion deal for Boxer had been signed. There will be four variants, for a total of 523 units. Deliveries will start in 2023. The UK will procure Boxer in three/four (source dependent) main variants. These are the baseline protected mobility (PM) variant (MIV-PM), a command and control (MIV-CC), an ambulance (MIV-A), and a repair/recovery (MIV-REP) variant. MIV-REP and MIV-REC (REC - recovery) are understood to have been combined into a repair and recovery vehicle retaining the MIV-REP designation. 
In terms of numbers, 285 personnel-carrying variants are on order, divided into 85 infantry carriers, 60 engineer section vehicles, 62 recce/fire support vehicles, and 28 mortar carriers. Another 50 of the APC variants are to be configured for equipment support as repair vehicles (MIV-REP) and these are dependent on source presented as the fourth variant. A total of 177 Boxer are ordered in the C4I configurations, again divided into 123 command-and-control (C2) and C2 utility vehicles, 19 observation post vehicles, 24 beyond-line-of-sight observation platforms, and 11 EW and SIGINT platforms. The remaining 61 are to be ambulances. A further 100 with no variant breakdown were announced in April 2022, bringing overall totals to 623.

See also

References

External links
 
 Boxer interview with Stefan Lishka, MD of ARTEC
 Boxer offer for UK – 10 min detailed interview with Rheinmetall Defence UK
 Artec Boxer
 Boxer – Infantry fighting vehicle – Rheinmetall Defence
 Boxer at ThinkDefence.co.uk
 Boxer Drive Module hull

Infantry fighting vehicles
Armoured fighting vehicles of the post–Cold War period
Armoured personnel carriers of Germany
Rheinmetall
Wheeled infantry fighting vehicles
Armoured fighting vehicles of the Netherlands
Military vehicles introduced in the 2000s
Armoured fighting vehicles of the United Kingdom